Jarred Jardine is a South African cricketer. He made his Twenty20 debut for Northerns in the 2019–20 CSA Provincial T20 Cup on 13 September 2019.

References

External links
 

Year of birth missing (living people)
Living people
South African cricketers
Northerns cricketers
Place of birth missing (living people)